KXNC (104.7 FM, "Kiss 104.7") is a radio station broadcasting a Top 40/CHR music radio format. Licensed to Ness City, Kansas, United States, it serves the Hays, Kansas and Great Bend, Kansas area. The station is currently owned by Post Rock Radio, a division of MyTown Media, LLC based in Pittsburg, Kansas.

KXNC currently airs the syndicated "Dave & Jimmy Morning Show" weekday mornings from 6am-9am. "The Afternoon Zoo with Chris Elsen" airs from 3pm-6pm weekdays. Weekend programming includes "The Weekend Top 30 with Ramiro", "In The Mix with DJ Grooves", "Sunday Night Slow Jams" and "The Baka Boyz Mix Show".

Sales Manager   Phil McComb (since July 2014)

Program Director  Chris Elsen (since November 2009)

Sports Director   Wes Balun   (since September 2011)

References

External links

XNC
Contemporary hit radio stations in the United States
Radio stations established in 2009